Gaetbulibacter saemankumensis is a Gram-negative and rod-shaped bacterium from the genus of Gaetbulibacter which has been isolated from tidal flat sediments from the Yellow Sea.

References

Flavobacteria
Bacteria described in 2005